Group A was one of four groups of national teams competing at the 2010 Africa Cup of Nations. The group's first round of matches began on January 10 and its last matches were played on January 18. Most matches were played at the Estádio 11 de Novembro in Luanda and featured the host Angola, joined by Mali, Algeria, and  Malawi. The opening day saw an extraordinary game which saw Mali come four goals down to tie Angola 4-4, although it was Angola that made it to the second round.

Standings

Angola vs Mali

Malawi vs Algeria

Mali vs Algeria

Angola vs Malawi

Angola vs Algeria

Mali vs Malawi

References

Group
2010 in Angolan football
2009–10 in Algerian football
2010 in Malawian sport
2010 in Malian sport